Sherwood Colliery F.C. is an English football club based in Mansfield Woodhouse, Nottinghamshire. The club is a FA Charter Standard Club affiliated to the Nottinghamshire County Football Association. The club's nickname is The Wood.

History
The club was formed in 2008, although a club of the same name did compete in the FA Cup in the late 1940s and early 1950s. They joined the Central Midlands League in 2012, and entered the FA Vase for the first time in 2016 where they beat both Penistone Church and Clipstone both of higher divisions before being knocked out 3–2 by Westfields. The 2017–18 season saw the club finish as runners-up in the league and subsequently gain promotion to the East Midlands Counties Football League. The 2019–20 season saw the club enter the FA Cup for the first time, getting past Quorn F.C. in the extra preliminary round, before losing out to Loughborough Dynamo in a replay in the next round. In 2021, the club were promoted to the Premier Division of the Northern Counties East League based on their results in the abandoned 2019–20 and 2020–21 seasons.

Ground

The club play their home games at Debdale Park.

Honours
Central Midlands Football League
 Floodlight Cup (1) 2016–17
Midland Amateur Alliance
Division One 2010-11

Records
Best FA Vase performance: Second round, 2016–17, 2019–20
Best FA Cup performance: Preliminary qualifying round, 2019–20

References

External links
Official website

Football clubs in England
Football clubs in Nottinghamshire
Central Midlands Football League
Association football clubs established in 2008
2008 establishments in England
East Midlands Counties Football League
Mining association football teams in England
Northern Counties East Football League